Sherman Eugene Ferguson (October 31, 1944 – January 22, 2006) was an American jazz drummer. For a time he was a member of the jazz trio Heard Ranier Ferguson.

Background
Ferguson once said that when people asked him what he did, he wouldn't tell them he was a musician, he'd say he was a jazz musician. He said he was proud of it and he would wear it as a statement on his forehead if he could.

He also wrote liner notes and was a contributing writer. He wrote liner notes and articles for jazz magazines such as Bird and L.A. Jazz Scene.

Ferguson first played professionally around 1963, working with Charles Earland, Shirley Scott, Don Patterson, and Groove Holmes. he also recorded frequently with Pat Martino. Concomitantly he worked as a child tutor for the Model Cities program in Philadelphia. He was a founding member of Catalyst, a jazz fusion ensemble, in 1970, remaining with them until their breakup. He then moved to Los Angeles, where he became a prolific session musician, playing on albums by Dizzy Gillespie, Horace Silver, and Benny Carter among many others. He formed a trio with John Heard and Tom Ranier.  He taught jazz theory at UCLA, UC-Irvine, and Jackson State University. He released the album Welcome to My Vision, on his own label Jazz-a-nance in 2002. Among the tracks on the album were "Lush Life", "Lester Left Town" and Bobby Watson's "Monk He See, Monk He Do". The band comprised Ferguson on drums, saxophonists Louis Van Taylor and Carl Randall and bassist Trevor Ware.

On January 22, 2006, Ferguson died at his  La Crescenta  home aged 61. The death was a result of diabetes.

Discography

As leader
 Sherman Ferguson's Jazz Union, Welcome to My Vision

With Catalyst
 Catalyst (Cobblestone, 1972)
 Perception (Muse, 1973)
 Unity (Muse, 1974)
 A Tear and a Smile (Muse, 1976)
 Heard Ranier Ferguson (ITI, 1983)

As sideman
With Kenny Burrell
 Handcrafted (Muse, 1978)
 Kenny Burrell Live at the Village Vanguard (Muse, 1978 [1980])
 Kenny Burrell in New York (Muse, 1978 [1981])
Then Along Came Kenny (Evidence, 1993 [1996])
With George Cables
 Morning Song (HighNote, 1980 [2008])
With Benny Carter
Another Time, Another Place (Evening Star, 1996) with Phil Woods
Benny Carter Songbook (MusicMasters, 1996)
New York Nights (MusicMasters 1997)
Benny Carter Songbook Volume II (MusicMasters, 1997)
With Warne Marsh
 Two Days in the Life of... (Interplay, 1987)
With Pat Martino
 Desperado (Prestige, 1970)
 Pat Martino/Live! (Muse, 1972 [1974])
 Consciousness (Muse, 1974)
 Interchange (Muse, 1994)
With Tete Montoliu
 Carmina (Jazzizz, 1984)
With Pharoah Sanders
 Crescent with Love (Evidence/Venus, 1992)
 Ballads with Love (Venus, 1992)
With Bud Shank
 California Concert (Contemporary, 1985) with Shorty Rogers
 Serious Swingers (Contemporary, 1987) with Bill Perkins

References

Jason Ankeny, [ Sherman Ferguson] at Allmusic
Listening In: An Interview with Sherman Ferguson by Bob Rosenbaum, Los Angeles, September 1981 (PDF file)

External links
 Sherman Ferguson's Jazz Union: Welcome to My Vision . . . (2003) by Jack Bowers

1944 births
2006 deaths
American jazz drummers
Singers from Pennsylvania
UCLA Herb Alpert School of Music faculty
University of California, Irvine faculty
Jackson State University faculty
20th-century American drummers
American male drummers
20th-century American singers
Jazz musicians from Pennsylvania
20th-century American male musicians
American male jazz musicians
Catalyst (band) members